Pollack is a surname. It derives from Polish noun Polak, meaning a Pole. Notable people with the surname include:

 Alan W. Pollack, American musicologist
 Andrea Pollack (1961–2019), East German swimmer
 Andrew Pollack (b. 1966), American school safety activist
 Ben Pollack (1903–1971), American drummer and bandleader
 Brittany Pollack, American ballet dancer
 Daniel Pollack, American pianist
 David M. Pollack, (b. 1982), American football linebacker
 Egon Pollack (1898–1984), Austrian footballer
 Eileen Pollack (b. 1956), American novelist, essayist and writer
 Gadi Pollack, Israeli illustrator
 Golan Pollack (b. 1991), Israeli Olympic judoka
 Harold Pollack, American professor at the University of Chicago
 Harvey Pollack (1922–2015), American statistician
 Henry Pollack (b. 1961), Cuban-born American radio host
 Henry Pollack, American professor 
 Howard Pollack (b. 1952), American professor 
 James B. Pollack (1938–1994), American astrophysicist
 Junco Sato Pollack, Japanese American contemporary artist
 Kenneth M. Pollack (b. 1966), American CIA intelligence analyst
 Lew Pollack (1895–1946), American composer
 Martha Pollack (b. 1958), 14th president of Cornell University
 Maurice Pollack (1885–1968), Canadian merchant and philanthropist
 Michael Pollack (musician), American musician
 Michael Pollack, the birth name of Michael J. Pollard (1939-2019), American actor
 Neal Pollack (b. 1970), American satirist, novelist and writer
 Olaf Pollack (b. 1973), East German road racing cyclist 
 Rachel Pollack (b. 1945), American science fiction author and comic book writer
 Reginald Pollack (1924–2001), American painter
 Richard M. Pollack (1935–2018), American mathematician
 Robert Pollack (disambiguation)
 Robert Pollack (biologist), American biologist
 Rocky Pollack, Canadian Manitoba judge
 Rozanne Pollack (b. 1948), American bridge player
 Stephanie Pollack, American public servant
 Sydney Pollack (1934–2008), American film director, producer and actor
 William Pollack (1926–2013), British-born American immunologist

Fictional people named Pollack
Bertie Pollack

See also 
 Pollack (disambiguation)→
 Pollock (disambiguation)

Slavic-language surnames
Jewish surnames
Ethnonymic surnames